Niles is an unincorporated community in Ottawa County, Kansas, United States.  As of the 2020 census, the population of the community and nearby areas was 56.

History
A post office was opened in Niles (originally called Nilesville) in 1885, and remained in operation until it was discontinued in 1974.

Demographics

For statistical purposes, the United States Census Bureau has defined Niles as a census-designated place (CDP).

Education
The community is served by Solomon USD 393 public school district.

References

Further reading

External links
 Ottawa County maps: Current, Historic, KDOT

Unincorporated communities in Ottawa County, Kansas
Unincorporated communities in Kansas